Elnatan Salami (born April 5, 1986) is an Israeli footballer who plays for Beitar Petah Tikva. He previously played for Hapoel Petah Tikva, Maccabi Herzliya, Maccabi Netanya, Hapoel Acre, Beitar Tel Aviv Ramla, Hapoel Afula, F.C. Shikun HaMizrah, Sektzia Ness Ziona and Hapoel Kfar Saba. At international level, Salami was capped at levels from under-17 to under-21.

Career
Salami has started his career in Hapoel Petah Tikva youth club and in the 2003/04 season he was promoted to the senior team. Salami won the Toto Cup with Petah Tikva in  2004/05, and stayed with the club another two seasons until it dropped to the second league. He played 20 games with Petah Tikva during the 2006/07 season, earning three yellow cards. In the 2007/08 season, Salami moved to Maccabi Herzliya and played 12 games, earning three yellow cards but failing to score a goal. At the end of that season Herzliyya dropped to the second league, but at the start of the next season he moved back to Hapoel Petah Tikva. In the beginning of the 2008/09 season, towards the end of September, Salami moved to Maccabi Netanya and was released at the end of December to Hapoel Kfar Saba.

References

1986 births
Israeli Jews
Living people
Israeli footballers
Hapoel Petah Tikva F.C. players
Maccabi Herzliya F.C. players
Maccabi Netanya F.C. players
Hapoel Kfar Saba F.C. players
Sektzia Ness Ziona F.C. players
Hapoel Acre F.C. players
Beitar Tel Aviv Bat Yam F.C. players
Hapoel Afula F.C. players
F.C. Shikun HaMizrah players
Beitar Kfar Saba F.C. players
Hapoel Mahane Yehuda F.C. players
Hapoel Bik'at HaYarden F.C. players
Beitar Petah Tikva F.C. players
Israeli Premier League players
Liga Leumit players
Footballers from Petah Tikva
Association football forwards
Israel under-21 international footballers